St Gregory's Catholic School (often shortened to St Greg's) is an 11–18 mixed, Roman Catholic, secondary school and sixth form with academy status in Royal Tunbridge Wells, Kent, England. It was established in 1966 and is part of the Kent Catholic Schools' Partnership. It is located in the Roman Catholic Archdiocese of Southwark.

Areas of Learning 
The school is arranged into five Areas of Learning (AoL). Students are assigned to an Area which they will remain in throughout their school career. This allows them to develop a supportive relationship with their peers and teachers in their Area. Students can move to another Area with good reason and family members may be put into the same Area.

The Areas of Learning are led by an Assistant Headteacher, supported by a Pastoral Leader/Manager. The five Areas are:

 Communication & Culture (CC) — English, MFL, Film Studies, Media Studies, Drama
 Creative & Physical Design (CPD) — Art, Music, PE, Technology
 Ethos & Personal Development (EPD) — RE, Citizenship, PHSE, History
 Environmental & Scientific Understanding (ESU) — Science (Biology, Chemistry, Physics), Geography
 Numeracy & Enterprise (NE) — Maths, ICT, Business, Statistics

Sixth form 
The sixth form at St Gregory's is regarded as being the most influential and responsible part of the school. All of the Year 12 students are deemed to be "Prefects", with some of them, through application and interview procedures made "Senior Prefects". In Year 12, students can take a mixture of AS and AVCEs and some may choose to follow an intermediate VCE with a view to taking up advanced courses later.

A range of options are available in the sixth form, including GCE A Level, Applied A levels and BTEC qualifications.

Notable alumni 
Alumni of St Gregory's Catholic School are known as Old Gregorians.

 Chris White, politician

References

External links 
 

Schools in Royal Tunbridge Wells
Secondary schools in Kent
Academies in Kent
Catholic secondary schools in the Archdiocese of Southwark
Educational institutions established in 1966
1966 establishments in England